Poquonnock Bridge is a village and census-designated place (CDP) in the town of Groton in New London County, Connecticut, United States. The population was 1,727 at the 2010 census.

The village is located just east of the head of the Poquonnock River near the intersection of U.S. Route 1 and Connecticut Route 117. The village was first settled in 1652–53 by James Morgan, James Avery, and Nehemiah Smith. The Groton Town Hall is located in the village.

Geography

Demographics
As of the census of 2000, there were 1,592 people, 588 households, and 415 families residing in the CDP. The racial makeup of the CDP was 65.45% White, 14.13% African American, 3.83% Native American, 8.04% Asian, 0.25% Pacific Islander, 1.76% from other races, and 6.53% from two or more races. Hispanic or Latino of any race were 6.16% of the population.

There were 588 households, out of which 38.9% had children under the age of 18 living with them, 41.8% were married couples living together, 22.4% had a female householder with no husband present, and 29.3% were non-families. 23.5% of all households were made up of individuals, and 7.7% had someone living alone who was 65 years of age or older.  The average household was 2.71 person, and the average family size was 3.14.

In the CDP, the population was spread out, with 29.8% under the age of 18, 9.2% from 18 to 24, 31.3% from 25 to 44, 19.3% from 45 to 64, and 10.4% who were 65 years of age or older.  The median age was 33 years. For every 100 females, there were 95.8 males.  For every 100 females age 18 and over, there were 91.4 males.

The median income for a household in the CDP was $33,652, and the median income for a family was $35,592. Males had a median income of $24,219 versus $21,250 for females. The per capita income for the CDP was $14,664.  About 11.2% of families and 15.5% of the population were below the poverty line, including 23.5% of those under age 18, and 5.4% of those age 65 or over.

References

Groton, Connecticut
Census-designated places in New London County, Connecticut
Villages in Connecticut
Connecticut placenames of Native American origin
Populated places established in 1652
1652 establishments in Connecticut
Villages in New London County, Connecticut
Census-designated places in Connecticut